Hristijan Mickoski is a Macedonian politician, university professor and president of VMRO-DPMNE. In 2016, he became the director of JSC "Power Plants of Macedonia", and in the period 2015—2017 he was energy advisor to the prime ministers Nikola Gruevski and Emil Dimitriev. He was elected leader of VMRO-DPMNE at the party's 16th congress in Valandovo.

Biography 

Mickoski was born on 29 September 1977 in Skopje, then in Socialist Republic of Macedonia, part of SFR Yugoslavia. He was the president of ELEM, the state-owned electricity producing company. He became a PhD and an associate professor at the Faculty of Mechanical Engineering at the Ss. Cyril and Methodius University in Skopje.

Party leader 
After the resignation of Nikola Gruevski, Mickoski became the new leader of the VMRO-DPMNE party in December 2017, and thus leader of the opposition in the country. Mickoski has stated that he and his party are in favour of EU and NATO but not with capitulation. However the veracity of his pro-EU and pro-NATO orientation has been met with doubt by some political observers. Mickoski has close ties with the Hungarian and Serbian presidents Orban and Vučić. He and the party he leads became one of the main participants of the 2022 North Macedonia protests against the French proposal for the start of the negotiation process of North Macedonia and the EU.

Controversies 
According to the Makfax news agency, Hristijan Mickoski as a student was a candidate of the Liberal Democratic Party for the presidency of SSUKM. This information was provided by some dissatisfied party members when he was elected party secretary general in July 2017. Some members of VMRO-DPMNE accused that he was not a member of the party until 2010. In August 2022, Mickoski vowed to leave politics forever, if Bulgarians were included in the country's constitution, a mandatory requirement included in the negotiating framework with the EU. In September he initiated the holding of a referendum under which the friendship treaty between Bulgaria and North Macedonia would be denounced.

Personal life 
Mickoski is married to Roza Mickoska, a Macedonian language professor in a gymnasium.

References 

Academic staff of the Ss. Cyril and Methodius University of Skopje
VMRO-DPMNE politicians
Living people
Macedonian engineers
Macedonian nationalists
1977 births